The second and final season of the American television series La Piloto created by Jörg Hiller premiered in Mexico on 18 June 2018 and concluded on 7 October 2018, unlike the previous season that premiered on Univision, this season premiered on Las Estrellas.

Cast

Main 
 Livia Brito as Yolanda Cadena
 Arap Bethke as John Lucio
 Juan Colucho as Dave Mejía
 María de la Fuente as Mónica Ortega
 Margarita Muñoz as Andrea Pulido
 Oka Giner as Olivia Nieves
 Ilza Ponko as Irina Kilichenko
 Tommy Vásquez as Arnoldo Santamaría
 Stephanie Salas as Rosalba Cadena
 Lisardo as Vasily Kilichenko
 Mauricio Aspe as Arley Mena
 Paulo Quevedo as Bill Morrison
 Juan Vidal as Bastián Regueros
 Julia Urbini as Felicidad
 Mauricio Pimentel as Muñeco
 Nico Galán as Wilmer Aguilar 
 Julio Echeverry as Gilberto Pulido

Recurring 
Diego Escalona as Arley Junior
 Verónica Montes as Lizbeth Álvarez
 Aroa Gimeno as Ana San Miguel
 Mikael Lacko as Tony Waters
 Rodrigo Massa as Aldo Tapia

Production

Casting 
This season they do not have the participation of María Fernanda Yepes, Alejandro Nones, Verónica Montes, and Arturo Barba who were part of the main cast of the previous season. Macarena Achaga, who played Olivia, was replaced by actress Oka Giner, due to Achaga's health problems. In this season new actors were integrated such as Ilza Ponko who will play the main villain, Margarita Muñoz, Paulo Quevedo, Oka Giner, Mikael Lacko, Julio Echeverry, Lisardo, and Mauricio Pimentel, returning cast from previous seasons of the series include: Livia Brito as the titular character, Arap Bethke, Tommy Vásquez, Juan Colucho, Stephanie Salas, María de la Fuente, and Nico Galán.

Episodes

References 

2018 American television seasons
2018 Mexican television seasons